The De Tomaso Mangusta is a sports car produced by Italian automobile manufacturer De Tomaso between 1967 and 1971. It was succeeded by the De Tomaso Pantera.

History

The Mangusta replaced the Vallelunga model, on which its chassis was based. The word "mangusta" is Italian for "mongoose", an animal that can kill cobras. It was rumored that the car was so named in retaliation to a failed deal between De Tomaso and Carroll Shelby. Alejandro de Tomaso offered to help Carroll Shelby to build a new Can-Am race car at the end of 1964 when Shelby found that the Shelby Cobra would not be able to compete there. De Tomaso was planning to develop a new 7.0-litre V8 engine for racing so he saw this as a perfect opportunity. Shelby agreed to finance the project and also sent a SCCA approved design team headed by Pete Brock to Italy in order to handle the design work. De Tomaso had conflicts on the design of the car. He also failed to deliver the agreed 5 race cars within the deadline for the 1965 Can-Am season. This caused Shelby to eventually back out of the project and join the development team of the Ford GT40. Peter Brock and his team were able to finish the car according to their will. De Tomaso engaged Carrozzeria Ghia to finalise the design of the car which was being developed under the project name of P70. The single completed car was displayed at the 1965 Turin Motor Show as the Ghia De Tomaso Sport 5000. De Tomaso then modified the steel backbone chassis of the P70 and it became the basis for the Mangusta,  which was designed by Giorgetto Giugiaro at Ghia. The Mangusta entered production in 1967, at the same time De Tomaso had purchased Ghia.

401 cars in total were built, about 150 were made for Europe, while the remainder were made for North America. The initial cars are claimed to have a more powerful Ford HiPo 289 engine; the later cars all had Ford 302 engines. The Mangusta was imported into the United States via a federal waiver which applied to the car due to its small production numbers. The waiver exempted the car from safety regulations which were in effect in the time as the Mangusta came without seat belts and had headlights far lower than what the federal regulations allowed. When this exemption expired, the front of the North American car was redesigned in order to accommodate two pop-up headlamps instead of the quad round headlamps present earlier. These new headlamps functioned through a crude lever-and-cable arrangement, which fed into the cabin. An estimated 50 cars were produced in this configuration starting in 1969, however European cars continued with the original quad headlight grille. One car was built as a roadster (8ma512).  One car was built with a high performance Chevrolet 327 engine for General Motors-Vice President, Bill Mitchell but soon sold to a GM employee, designer, Dick Ruzzin who has owned the car since.

Specifications
The Mangusta was designed by Giorgetto Giugiaro, whose main highlight is a center-hinged, two-section hood that opened akin to gullwing doors. The early European versions were fitted with a mid-mounted  Ford 289 V8 engine, driven through a 5-speed ZF transaxle; but for almost all Mangustas for both Europe and North America an unmodified "J Code"   Ford 302 V8 was used. All round Girling disc brakes and independent suspension, rack and pinion steering, air conditioning, and power windows were fitted, ahead of other manufacturers at the time. Journalist Paul Frère claimed he achieved a top speed of 250 km/h (155 mph) in the Mangusta.

The Mangusta was relatively inexpensive for the time, but with a 44/56 front/rear weight distribution reportedly suffered from stability problems and poor handling. The car's cabin was also cramped and it had extremely low ground clearance.

Revival

The Mangusta name was revived in the early 2000s when the concept car De Tomaso Biguà became the Qvale Mangusta, after a dispute between De Tomaso and business partner Qvale. The Qvale sold only in limited numbers.

Media 	
In the 2004 movie Kill Bill: Volume 2, the character Bill (David Carradine) has a silver Mangusta. In the music video to the Kylie Minogue song "Can't Get You Out of My Head", a yellow Mangusta can be seen. A red Mangusta is seen and mentioned in conversation in the 1971 Disney movie The Barefoot Executive. The 1974 movie Gone in 60 Seconds featured a white Mangusta. It also appears in the PlayStation 4 and PlayStation 5 racing game, Gran Turismo 7, as a playable vehicle, both in standard guise and in a special livery variant made in collaboration with Dior for the game.

Gallery

See also 

 Alfa Romeo 33 Stradale
 Ferrari Daytona
 Iso Grifo
 Lamborghini Miura
 Maserati Ghibli

References

External links

 Pictures of a 1969 De Tomaso Mangusta
 The PROVAMO registry of De Tomaso Automobiles
 The Mangusta International Mangusta Registry
 The QV500 Registry of De Tomaso Automobiles
A small De Tomaso registry in Excel format that can be downloaded. Includes a page dedicated to the Mangusta

Me Gusta
Rear mid-engine, rear-wheel-drive vehicles
Cars introduced in 1967
1970s cars
Automobiles with backbone chassis
Group 4 (racing) cars